The 1953 NCAA Swimming and Diving Championships were contested in March 1953 at the Ohio State Natatorium at the Ohio State University in Columbus, Ohio at the 17th annual NCAA-sanctioned swim meet to determine the team and individual national champions of men's collegiate swimming and diving in the United States. 

Yale topped hosts, and defending national champions, Ohio State in the team standings to capture the Bulldogs' fourth national title (and second title in three years).

Team standings
Note: Top 10 only
(H) = Hosts
Full results

See also
List of college swimming and diving teams

References

NCAA Division I Men's Swimming and Diving Championships
NCAA Swimming And Diving Championships
NCAA Swimming And Diving Championships
NCAA Swimming And Diving Championships